Cirroteuthidae is a family of cirrate octopuses comprising three species in two genera.

Species
Genus Cirroteuthis
Cirroteuthis muelleri
Genus Cirrothauma
Cirrothauma magna
Cirrothauma murrayi, blind cirrate

External links
Tree of Life website gives information about the classification of cephalopod groups
Cirroteuthidae discussion forum at TONMO.com

Octopuses
Cephalopod families
Taxa named by Wilhelm Moritz Keferstein